Deborah Marie Tranelli (born July 6, 1955) is an American actress and singer.

Tranelli is best known for her recurring role in the soap opera Dallas as Phyllis, secretary to Bobby Ewing (played by Patrick Duffy). She appeared in the series from 1981 to its end in 1991. Her acting career has included roles on television series from Nero Wolfe "Might as Well Be Dead" (1981) to Law & Order "Seed" (1995). She starred in and performed the song "Rather Love" in the 1985 movie Naked Vengeance, and released a 2004 jazz album "A Lot of Livin'" which won three BackStage Bistro awards. She has more recently been performing theatre in New York City.

Tranelli attended Linton High School in Schenectady, New York and is a 1977 graduate of Northwestern University.

References

External links

1955 births
American television actresses
Living people
Actors from Schenectady, New York
Northwestern University alumni
21st-century American women